Stemless gentian is a common name for several plants and may refer to:

Gentiana acaulis, native to central and southern Europe
Gentiana clusii, native to Europe